Bharatamlo Bala Chandrudu  is a 1988 Telugu-language action film produced by D. Kishore under the Jayabheri Art Productions banner, presented by Murali Mohan and directed by Kodi Ramakrishna. It stars Nandamuri Balakrishna, Bhanupriya  and music  composed by Chakravarthy.

Plot
The film begins with three treacherous Prabhakar, Govardhanam, & D.I.G. Gundu Rao who creates mayhem in the country under the veil of patriots. Balachandra a mettlesome consistently antagonizes them from a forest where the tribal deifies him. Hence, the knaves forge him as a terrorist and inculpate him in notoriety. Once on a forest trip, Bhanu daughter of Govardhanam idolizes Balachandra and conjoins him. Inspector Ranjith Kumar a candid cop bolts the illegal activities of Prabhakar undeterred by any threats. Hence, he utilizes a stratagem by assigning the responsibility for tracking down Balachandra to Ranjith. Immediately, he takes charge, acquainted with Balachandra in the forest where he fathoms his excellence of him and vows to wind up the convicts. Accordingly, he apprehends Prabhakar but he vindicates him with deviousness. Ranjith has to pay a penalty for it, by suspension. Moreover, Prabhakar brutally kills his family excluding his wife Vijaya. Then, break down Ranjith's fuses with Balachandra. Now with a play, he eliminates the foes and surrenders. The court penalizes them to hang him when he questions the constitutional system of the country and produces 3 venomous alive. Thus, the judiciary makes its amends by acquitting Balachandra and declaring the trio as treasons. Prior they leave jeer, to walk free with their power when enraged Vijaya kills them as a devastated mother. Finally, the movie ends with Balachandra pledging before her to protect the sovereignty of the country.

Cast 
 Nandamuri Balakrishna as Balachandra
 Bhanupriya as Bhanu
 Rao Gopal Rao as Govardhanam
 Suresh Oberoi as Prabhakar
 Murali Mohan as Inspector Ranjeeth Kumar
 Giri Babu as D.I.G. Gundu Rao
 Ranganath as DFO Chandra Shekar
 Jaya Sudha as Vijaya
 Rajyalakshmi as Sujatha
 Poornima as Venkatalakshmi
 Y. Vijaya

Soundtrack 

Music composed by Chakravarthy. Music released on Cauvery Audio Company.

Other 
 VCDs and DVDs on — ADITYA Videos, Hyderabad

References 

1988 films
Films directed by Kodi Ramakrishna
Films scored by K. Chakravarthy
1980s Telugu-language films